Care of Footpath 2 (Hindi: Kill Them Young) is a 2015 Indian bi-lingual drama film directed by Kishan Shrikanth and produced by Devaraj Pande. In addition to direction, Kishan has composed music, enacted and edited the film. The film is a sequel to Kishan's Care of Footpath (2006) which won him many laurels. The film stars Avika Gor, Deepp Pathak, Esha Deol, Dingri Naresh and Karthik Jayaram in the main roles. The film also features special performances from Bollywood personalities such as Shafiq Syed of Salaam Bombay! fame and director Anees Bazmee. The film examines the Indian legal system through the trial of four juveniles who hatch a plan to kill a corrupt police officer.

Care of Footpath 2 premiered in Los Angeles on 6 November 2015 prior to its release in India.

Cast
 Avika Gor as Geetha
 Esha Deol as Meera
 Karthik Jayaram as Police officer
 Kishan Shrikanth as Krishna
 Dingri Naresh as Dingri
 Shravanthi Sainath as TV reporter
 Anees Bazmee
 Shafiq Syed
 Master Hirannaiah
 Shivaram

Production
After a gap of four years, director Kishan Shrikanth came up with the idea of making a sequel to his first installment Care of Footpath. Terming the film as "not a typical sequel", the director said it took three years to conceive and conceptualize the subject for the film. He visited the real street children who had their brush with crime and understood their plight which resulted him to form a screenplay.

Reception

Critical response

International
On 5 November 2015, the Los Angeles Times reviewed the film as "an exercise in excess" and drew parallels of the film making style to that of Danny Boyle's films. The film criticized the plot as a "bombastic, overlong melodrama that doesn't recognize the occasional need to takes things down a decibel or three" while praising the lead performances.

In India
Upon release in India, the film garnered critical reviews with the Bangalore Mirror rating the film 3.5 Stars quoting 'From beginning to end, the movie does not let you down with its fast narrative and constant entry and exit of characters.'

Soundtrack

The soundtrack album comprises five tracks including three instrumentals, and was composed by 3 composers: Vivek Kar, Manoj Srihari and Kishan Shrikanth. It was released on 3 November 2015.

Track listing

References

External links

Official website

2015 films
2015 crime drama films
2015 multilingual films
2010s Hindi-language films
Films scored by Vivek Kar
Indian crime drama films
Indian multilingual films
Films set in Mumbai
2010s Kannada-language films